The Switzerland women's national tennis team represents Switzerland in Fed Cup tennis competition and are governed by Swiss Tennis.  They currently compete in World Group.

Current team
Most recent year-end rankings are used.

History
Switzerland competed in its first Fed Cup in 1963.  Their best result was the win of the Billie Jean King Cup in 2022 they also reaching the final in 1998, where they lost to Spain 3-2 and 2020-21, where they lost to the Russian Tennis Federation 2–0.

Results
Only World Group, World Group Play-off, World Group II, and World Group II Play-off ties are included.

1963–1969

1970–1979

1980–1989

1990–1999

2000–2009

2010–2019

2020–2029

References

External links

Billie Jean King Cup teams
Fed Cup
Fed Cup